Phricanthes flexilineana is a species of moth of the family Tortricidae first described by Francis Walker in 1863. The species was described from Sri Lanka, northern Queensland in Australia and the Seychelles, but has a much wider range, which includes Madagascar, India, Indonesia, Myanmar, New Guinea, the Philippines and Taiwan. It is also widely distributed in the tropical parts of North and South America.

The larvae have been recorded feeding on Tetracera volubilis, Dillenia indica and Davilla nitia.

References

Moths described in 1863
Phricanthini
Fauna of Seychelles